"Maybe Tomorrow" is the second single released by New Zealand band Goldenhorse from their debut triple platinum selling number-one album, Riverhead. The song, written by Geoff Maddock, has a laid-back guitar based tune and is a song about how that "maybe tomorrow, all of your sorrow ...will fade away in the air".

The song was released in 2003 and received major airplay with the single reaching #10 on RIANZ single charts. The song garnered huge popularity, reaching the #10 position on four occasions. The single stayed in the charts for 31 weeks, and became the #13 single of the year in New Zealand.

The song was nominated for several awards; it was a finalist in the 2003 Australasian Performing Rights Association's Silver Scroll Awards and a finalist in the 2004 New Zealand Music Awards. "Maybe Tomorrow " itself was also the most played song on New Zealand radio for 2002/2003  (and similarly won the Airplay Record of the Year award at the New Zealand Music Awards and the Most Performed Work award at the 2003 APRA Silver Scroll Awards).

This song is currently featured in the television adverts for the Interislander Ferry Service and was previously used in advertisements for Greggs.

The song was performed by the band at Auckland Central Remand Prison to Ahmed Zaoui to celebrate his 44th birthday.

Track listing
"Maybe Tomorrow"
"American Wife (Hollis Dance Mix)"
"Maybe Tomorrow" (Video)

Charts

Year-end charts

References

External links
Video review

2003 singles
2003 songs
Goldenhorse songs
EMI Records singles